Agnese Koklaca (born 2 March 1990) is a Latvian luger who has competed since 2006. Her best World Cup season finish was 41st twice, earning them in 2006-07 and 2008-09.

She made her Olympic debut in 2010, when finished 24th in the women's singles event.

References

External links
 
 
 
 

1990 births
Living people
Latvian female lugers
Olympic lugers of Latvia
Lugers at the 2010 Winter Olympics